"Smothered" is a single by American industrial metal band Spineshank. It was only released in the United States in CD format. The music video features the band performing in a room while they are filmed by numerous hidden cameras, which they find and destroy. The song was nominated for Best Metal Performance at the 46th Grammy Awards, but lost to Metallica's "St. Anger."

Track listing
Card sleeve single

Maxi single

Personnel
Jonny Santos – lead vocals
Mike Sarkisyan – guitar
Robert Garcia – bass, backing vocals
Tommy Decker – drums, electronics

References

External links
Official Music Video on YouTube

2003 singles
Spineshank songs
2003 songs
Song recordings produced by Garth Richardson
Roadrunner Records singles